Humberto Donoso Bertolotto (9 October 1938 – 4 May 2000) was a Chilean football defender who played for Chile in the 1966 FIFA World Cup. He also played for Club Universidad de Chile.

References

External links
FIFA profile
Humberto Donoso's obituary 

1938 births
2000 deaths
Chilean footballers
Chile international footballers
Association football defenders
Universidad de Chile footballers
1966 FIFA World Cup players
People from Arica